Pristosia atrema is a species of ground beetle in the Platyninae subfamily that is endemic to India, and can be found in such provinces as Uttar Pradesh and Uttarakhand.

References

Beetles described in 1926
Beetles of Asia
Endemic fauna of India